Gideon Nieuwoudt (1951–2005) was a former apartheid-era security policeman involved in the torture and murder of several anti-apartheid activists, including Steve Biko. Nieuwoudt, nicknamed "Notorious", was one of the most feared security policemen in the Eastern Cape for his interrogation methods including wet bags, poison, torture machines and often disguised himself as a priest, dubbing him the "Priest from hell". Nieuwoudt had up to five hearings at the Truth and Reconciliation Commission (TRC), in connection with the murders of numerous political activists.

Role in the murder of Steve Biko 

Nieuwoudt was implicated in the murder of the anti-apartheid activist Steve Biko, who was a leader in the Black Consciousness Movement (BCM). Nieuwoudt admitted to hitting Biko with a rubber hose, while he was being interrogated in a police office in Port Elizabeth. Nieuwoudt was denied amnesty by the TRC in 1999 for his role in the murder of Steve Biko.

Role in the murder of Siphiwe Mthimkhulu and Topsy Mdaka 
 
In 1992, Nieuwoudt was granted amnesty by the TRC for his role in the abduction, torture and murder of student anti-apartheid activists Siphiwe Mthimkhulu and Topsy Mdaka who were members of the Congress of South African Students (COSAS), otherwise known as the "Cosas Two". Nieuwoudt was involved in burning and disposing of the bodies into the Fish River at Post Chalmers. Nieuwoudt, while serving his prison sentence underwent a religious conversion as a result of which he asked the Mthimkhulu family for forgiveness, for his involvement in Siphiwe's murder. In 1998, a documentary was shown on television in which Niewoudt, accompanied by a camera crew, approached the Mthimkhulu's house and asked for forgiveness. Through this footage, Nieuwoudt quickly became a recognizable face to television viewers.

Role in the murder of the Pebco Three 

Nieuwoudt confessed to having been involved in the abduction, beating and murder of the anti-apartheid activists Qaqawuli Godolozi, Champion Galela and Sipho Hashe in 1985, who belonged to the Port Elizabeth Civic Organisation (PEBCO), otherwise known as the Pebco Three. In 1999, Nieuwoudt along with Herman Barend Du Plessis, Johannes Martin Van Zyl and Gerhardus Johannes Lotz were denied amnesty for their role in the murder of The Pebco Three.

Role in the murder of the Motherwell Four 

In 1989, Nieuwoudt along with Marthinus Ras and Wybrand du Toit were implicated in the killing of three black police officers Mbalala "Glen" Mgoduka, Amos Temba Faku, Desmond Daliwonga Mpipa and police informer Xolile Shepard Sakati in Motherwell. Nieuwoudt, Ras and du Toit planted a bomb in a car which blew up while the four police officers were driving. Nieuwoudt stated that the four police officers were killed because they had secretly joined the ANC. Niewoudt was sentenced to 20 years' imprisonment for the car bomb murder of what became known as the Motherwell Four.

Death 

Nieuwoudt was awaiting the outcome for his amnesty application for the murder of the Motherwell Four at the time of his death in 2005 at the age of 54 in Port Elizabeth. Nieuwoudt died of lung cancer which had further spread to other organs in his body.

References

Apartheid in South Africa
1951 births
2005 deaths
People from Port Elizabeth
South African police officers
Steve Biko affair
Deaths from cancer in South Africa
Deaths from lung cancer